Bambang Pamungkas (born 10 June 1980), also known as Bepe, is an Indonesian football manager and former player. As a footballer, he predominantly played for Persija Jakarta and the Indonesia national football team. His natural position is striker. Bambang made his name in South East Asian football when he scored the only goal for Indonesia at the 2002 Tiger Cup semifinal against Malaysia, and was the tournament's top scorer with eight goals.

Bambang is considered to be an Indonesian living legend and most successful player in Indonesia. He is known with an outstanding header of the ball, and has a reputation for sharpness in the penalty box. He earn 85 caps and 37 goals with the Indonesia national team, and is perhaps the team's most popular player among its supporters. He was considered one of top ten Asian players of 2012 by ESPN Soccernet.

Club career

Bambang played for several clubs around his hometown as a youth, before beginning his senior career with Persija Jakarta. He was the club's top goalscorer in 1999–2000 Liga Indonesia with 24 goals. In 2000, he joined EHC Norad in the Dutch Third Division. But after only 4 months he returned to Persija, the only Indonesian club he ever played for.

Bambang helped his club to win the Liga Indonesia in 2001, and he was awarded the accolade of that season's best player. Persija Jakarta narrowly missed out on winning the championship again in 2004 by one point. The following season Persija reached the 2005 final, but lost 2–3 to Persipura Jayapura.

Shortly afterwards Bambang accepted an offer to play in the Malaysian Football League with Selangor FA, along with national teammate Elie Aiboy. In his first season in Malaysia he won the Premier League Malaysia, FA Cup Malaysia, and Malaysia Cup, and became the league's top-scorer with 23 goals in 24 matches. During two seasons in Malaysia he scored 63 goals in four competitions: Malaysia Premier League, Malaysia Super League, FA Cup Malaysia, Malaysia Cup, AFC Cup. Despite having scored a total of 178 goals in Liga Indonesia, like Singaporean forward Indra Sahdan Daud, Bambang lost his place in the nation team to foreign-born talents.

In 2008, despite interests from English club Derby County, he opted to stay in Indonesia.

In 2010, he had a trial at FC Ingolstadt 04 but failed to secure a contract.

On 9 December 2013, he signed a one-year contract with Pelita Bandung Raya.

On 3 December 2014, Bambang moved back to Persija. On 17 December 2019, he announced his retirement from professional football after 19 years. His last match was a 1–3 away win for Persija against Kalteng Putra F.C. at the Tuah Pahoe Stadium.

On 17 January 2020, a month after his retirement, Bambang was chosen to become Persija's manager.

International career
In 199,8 Bambang's international career began when he was selected to play for the Indonesian U-19 team. His tally of seven goals at the Asian Cup made him the competition's top scorer. He made his senior international debut the following year in a friendly match against Lithuania, in which he scored one goal.

Bambang has taken part in four FIFA World Cup qualification campaigns (2002, 2006, 2010 and 2014), playing in 14 matches and scoring 3 times. Bambang has also been involved in three AFC Asian Cups: 2000, 2004 and 2007. He scored a goal against Bahrain in the 2007 AFC Asian Cup, in a match Indonesia won 2–1.

In the 2002 Tiger Cup, Bambang was the top scorer with 8 goals, but an injury ruled him out of the Indonesian squad for the 2004 event. He scored twice in the 2008 AFF Suzuki Cup, once against Myanmar and once against Cambodia. In 2010 AFF Suzuki Cup Bambang scored two goals in a match against Thailand, both from penalty kicks. He has scored a total of 12 goals in the ASEAN Football Championship, making him the 5th-highest goalscorer in ASEAN Football Championship history.

Controversy
On 18 December 2011, following the match between Sriwijaya and Persija Jakarta, Bambang, Ismed Sofyan and Leo Saputra were involved in an assault on Hilton Moreira at his hotel, allegedly provoked by Hilton's behaviour during the match.

Personal life
Bambang is married to Tribuana Tungga Dewi, with whom he has three daughters: Salsa Alicia, Jane Abel, Syaura Abana. The second youngest of 7 children. he initially had no thoughts of becoming a footballer. He likes reading and cooking, and has ambitions to become a teacher or a chef once his footballing career is over.

Bambang devotes some of his free time to charity work, promoting the Bambang Pamungkas Foundation that he set up to provide financial assistance and resources to schools in Indonesia. He is also involved in raising funds for children's cancer charities.

Public figure
As a well-known public figure, Bambang has appeared in many product endorsements, including for Biskuat, Ti Phone, Nike, Bodrex, and Kuku Bima.

The book Ketika Jemariku Menari details Bambang's life, career and teammates at club and national level, especially during the 2010 AFF Championship. Former Indonesiam national team manager Ivan Venkov Kolev comments in the book that Bambang is "a rare striker in Indonesia. Commitment and professionalism are the hallmarks of these players".

Summer Olympics
Bambang has been chosen as a torch bearer for 2012 Summer Olympics flame passage through Calderdale on 24 June 2012.

Career statistics

International

International goals
Scores and results list Indonesia's goal tally first.

Honours

Club

Persija
Liga 1: 2001, 2018
 Indonesia President's Cup: 2018
Selangor
Malaysia Premier League: 2005
Malaysia Cup: 2005
Malaysia FA Cup: 2005

International

Indonesia
Indonesian Independence Cup (1): 2008
 AFF Championship
 Runners-up (3) : 2000, 2002, 2010

Individual
 AFF Championship Top Scorer: 2002
 Liga Indonesia Top Scorer: 1999–00
 Liga Indonesia Best Player: 2001
 Malaysia Premier League Top Scorer: 2005
 Malaysia Cup Best Foreign Player 2005
 Malaysia FA Cup Top Scorer 2005
 Copa Indonesia Best Player: 2008
Indonesia Kids' Choice Awards favorite athlete: 2009
 IFFHS Men’s All Time Indonesia Dream Team: 2022'''

References

External links
  
 
 
 

1980 births
Living people
Javanese people
Indonesian footballers
Indonesian expatriate footballers
Expatriate footballers in Malaysia
Expatriate footballers in the Netherlands
Association football forwards
2000 AFC Asian Cup players
2004 AFC Asian Cup players
2007 AFC Asian Cup players
Indonesian expatriate sportspeople in Malaysia
Indonesia international footballers
Liga 1 (Indonesia) players
Persija Jakarta players
Pelita Bandung Raya players
People from Semarang
Selangor FA players
Southeast Asian Games bronze medalists for Indonesia
Southeast Asian Games medalists in football
Competitors at the 1999 Southeast Asian Games
EHC Hoensbroek players
Sportspeople from Central Java